Namat may refer to:

Namat language
Namat Abdullah